The term "microcinema" can have two meanings. It can describe low-budget or amateur films shot mostly on digital video, edited on a computer, and then distributed via videotape, disc or over the Internet. Or it can describe a mode of low-budget exhibition — a small theater or screening series operated in order to show small-gauge filmmaking, artists works, shorts, and repertory programming.

Microcinema is a flexible term that can cover anything — micro movies, animated shorts, bizarrely impressionistic video manipulations, hard-hitting documentaries, and garage-born feature-length movies. A classic microcinema offering is a film that probably would not exist if new technology hadn't allowed its creators to cut costs or inspired them to try something different.

History 
The term "microcinema" was first coined in 1994 by Rebecca Barten and David Sherman founders of San Francisco's Total Mobile Home microCINEMA, where all the films are "underground" because they're shown in the basement. The founders say they envisioned an alternative movement, a sort of cinematic microbrewery. And now, the word has come to describe an intimate, low-budget style of movie shot on relatively cheap formats like Hi-8 video, DV, and (less often) older do-it-yourself stock like 16mm film. 

As of late, a large growing subculture of film makers has risen in the wake of technological advancements that have made low-budget film making more affordable and pleasing to the eye. One camera in particular, that has made a large impact, is the Panasonic DVX100 followed recently by the Panasonic HVX200 High Definition camcorder (many other cameras are used as well but DVX and HVX are arguably the favorites).

Many film festivals and websites have hosted films made from the microcinema subculture. The rise of YouTube and other large video hosting websites has led to a flourishing of microcinema videos. In fact, many films are now finding their way to rental store chains and independent distributor line-ups.

Characteristics 
 Low-budget considering your locations and intent of distribution
 Tends to be shot on a video camera or 16mm camera
 Small crew (under 20 but usually around 5-10 people)
 Director tends to be the writer, producer, director of photography and editor
 Limited equipment owned by the director/crew or rented
 Initial distribution of film done by filmmaker
 Films premiere at film festivals or on the internet
 Actors are usually unknown in pop culture and work for free
 Directors are usually unknown in pop culture

References 
Film genres
Experimental film
Cinemas and movie theaters